The following outline is provided as an overview of and topical guide to Rome:

Rome – capital of Italy and a special comune (named Comune di Roma Capitale). Rome also serves as the capital of the Lazio region. With 2,876,076 residents in 1,285 km2 (496.1 sq mi), it is also the country's most populated comune. It is the fourth-most populous city in the European Union by population within city limits. It is the center of the Metropolitan City of Rome, which has a population of 4.3 million residents. Rome is located in the central-western portion of the Italian Peninsula, within Lazio (Latium), along the shores of the Tiber. 

The Vatican City is an independent city-state enclaved within Rome, the only existing example of a state within a city: for this reason, Rome has been often defined as the capital of two states. Rome is a very old city, founded over 28 centuries ago, and it was the center of power of the ancient Roman civilization.

General reference 
 Common English name(s): Rome
 Official English name(s): City of Rome
 Adjectival(s): Roman
 Demonym(s): Roman

Geography of Rome 

Geography of Rome
 Rome is:
 a city
 capital of Italy
 capital of Lazio
 capital of the Metropolitan City of Rome
 Population of Rome: 2,873,494
 Area of Rome:  
 Atlas of Rome
 Topography of ancient Rome

Location of Rome 

 Rome is situated within the following regions:
 Northern Hemisphere and Eastern Hemisphere
 Eurasia
 Europe (outline)
 Western Europe
 Southern Europe
 Italian Peninsula
 Italy (outline)
 Central Italy
 Lazio
 Rome metropolitan area
 Metropolitan City of Rome Capital
 Time zone(s): Central European Time (UTC+01), Central European Summer Time (UTC+02)

Environment of Rome 

 Climate of Rome
 Climate of Ancient Rome

Landforms of Rome 

 Hills in Rome
 Janiculum – second tallest hill in Rome.
 Monte Mario – highest hill in Rome.
 Monte Sacro
 Monte Testaccio
 Parioli
 Pincian Hill
 Seven hills of Rome
 Aventine Hill (Latin, Aventinus; Italian, Aventino)
 Caelian Hill (Cælius, Celio)
 Capitoline Hill (Capitolinus, Campidoglio)
 Esquiline Hill (Esquilinus, Esquilino)
 Palatine Hill (Palatinus, Palatino)
 Quirinal Hill (Quirinalis, Quirinale)
 Viminal Hill (Viminalis, Viminale)
 Vatican Hill
 Velian Hill
 Islands of Rome
 Tiber Island
 Rivers in Rome
 Tiber River

Areas of Rome 

 Ager Romanus
 Historic district of Rome
 Areas within Rome that are not actually part of Rome
 Vatican City (outline) – only example of a country inside a city. The sovereign territory of the Holy See of the Catholic Church.
 Seven hills of Rome

Administrative subdivisions of Rome 

Administrative subdivisions of Rome

 Municipi of Rome
 Municipio I - Historical Center-Prati
 Municipio II - Parioli/Nomentano-San Lorenzo
 Municipio III - Monte Sacro
 Municipio IV - Tiburtina
 Municipio IX - EUR
 Municipio V - Prenestino/Centocelle
 Municipio VI - Roma Delle Torri
 Municipio VII - San Giovanni/Cinecittà
 Municipio VIII - Appia Antica
 Municipio X - Ostia
 Municipio XI - Arvalia Portuense
 Municipio XII - Monte Verde
 Municipio XIII - Aurelia
 Municipio XIV - Monte Mario
 Municipio XV - Cassia Flaminia

 Rioni of Rome
 Borgo – lies next to Vatican City
 Campitelli – includes the Hills of Capitol and Palatine
 Campo Marzio
 Castro Pretorio
 Celio – includes Hill
 Colonna
 Esquilino – includes Esquiline Hill
 Ludovisi
 Monti – includes the Hills of Quirinal and Viminal
 Parione
 Pigna
 Ponte
 Prati
 Regola
 Ripa – includes the Hill of Aventine
 Sallustiano
 San Saba
 Sant'Angelo
 Sant'Eustachio
 Testaccio
 Trastevere – includes the so-called "8th Roman Hill" of the Gianicolo
 Trevi

Locations in Rome 

 Tourist attractions
 Museums in Rome
 Shopping areas and markets

Ancient monuments in Rome 

 

Ancient monuments in Rome
 Amphitheater of Caligula
 Amphitheatrum Castrense
 Ancient obelisks in Rome
Flaminio Obelisk
Lateran Obelisk
Obelisk of Montecitorio
 Ancient temples in Rome 
 Pantheon
 Temple of Castor and Pollux
 Temple of Hercules Victor
 Temple of Peace, Rome
 Temple of Portunus
 Temple of Saturn
 Temple of Venus Genetrix
 Temple of Vesta 
 Ancient triumphal arches in Rome
 Arch of Constantine
 Arch of Septimius Severus
 Ancient villas in Rome
 Villa of Livia
 Villa of the Quintilii
 Villa dei Sette Bassi
 Aqueducts in the city of Rome
Aqua Appia
Aqua Claudia
Aqua Marcia
 Ara Pacis
 Aurelian Walls
 Baths of Caracalla
 Baths of Titus
 Baths of Trajan
 Castel Sant'Angelo
 Circus Maximus
 Colosseum
 Column of Marcus Aurelius
 Comitium
 Domus Aurea
 Domus Transitoria
 Equestrian Statue of Marcus Aurelius
 Forum Boarium
 Forum of Augustus
 Gardens of Maecenas
 Gardens of Sallust
 House of Augustus
 Imperial fora
 Ludus Magnus
 Mausoleum of Augustus
 Pyramid of Cestius
 Roman Forum
 Monuments of the Roman Forum
 Sant'Omobono Area
 Servian Wall
 Stadium of Domitian
 Theatre of Marcellus
 Theatre of Pompey
 Trajan's Column
 Trajan's Market

Bridges in Rome 

Bridges of Rome
 Pons Cestius
 Pons Fabricius
 Ponte Milvio
 Ponte Sant'Angelo
 Ponte Sisto

Catacombs 

Catacombs of Rome
 Catacomb of Callixtus
 Catacombs of Generosa
 Catacombs of Marcellinus and Peter
 Catacombs of San Sebastiano
 Catacombs of San Valentino

Churches in Rome 

Basilicas and churches of Rome
 St. Peter's Basilica
 Sistine Chapel
 Archbasilica of Saint John Lateran
 Basilica of San Clemente al Laterano
 Basilica di Santa Maria Maggiore
 Basilica of Santa Maria in Ara Coeli
 Basilica of Saint Paul Outside the Walls
 Church of the Gesù
 San Carlo alle Quattro Fontane
 Santa Croce in Gerusalemme
 Santa Maria degli Angeli e dei Martiri
 Santa Maria in Cosmedin
 Santa Maria in Trastevere
 Santa Prassede
 Santa Sabina
 Sant'Ivo alla Sapienza
 Santa Maria della Vittoria
 Santa Maria del Popolo
 San Pietro in Vincoli

Fountains in Rome 

Fountains in Rome
 Fountain of Moses
 Fountain of the Four Rivers
 Fountains of St. Peter's Square
 Trevi Fountain
 Triton Fountain

Museums in Rome 

Museums in Rome
 Vatican Museums
 Galleria Borghese
 Galleria Nazionale d'Arte Antica
 Doria Pamphilj Gallery
 Museum of Roman Civilization
 Capitoline Museums
 National Roman Museum
 National Museum of Oriental Art

Palaces in Rome 

Palaces in Rome
 Palazzo Barberini
 Palazzo Chigi
 Palazzo Colonna
 Palazzo Corsini
 Palazzo Farnese
 Quirinal Palace
 Palazzo Pamphilj

Parks and gardens in Rome 

Parks and gardens in Rome 
 Appian Way Regional Park
 Orange Garden
 Parco Adriano
 Parco degli Acquedotti
 Park of the Caffarella
 Rome Rose Garden
 Villa Ada
 Villa Borghese gardens
 Villa Doria Pamphili
 Villa Torlonia

Public squares in Rome 

Piazzas in Rome
 Campo de' Fiori
 Largo di Torre Argentina
 Piazza Barberini
 Piazza Bocca della Verità
 Piazza Colonna
 Piazza d'Aracoeli
 Piazza del Popolo
 Piazza della Minerva
 Piazza della Repubblica
 Piazza di Monte Citorio
 Piazza Navona
 Piazza di Spagna
 Piazza Venezia
 St. Peter's Square

Streets of Rome 

Streets in Rome
 Appian Way
 Clivus Capitolinus
 Corso di Francia
 Corso Vittorio Emanuele II
 Lungoteveres in Rome
 Lungotevere on the right bank of the Tiber
 Lungotevere Maresciallo Diaz
 Lungotevere Maresciallo Cadorna
 Lungotevere Della Vittoria
 Lungotevere Guglielmo Oberdan
 Lungotevere delle Armi
 Lungotevere Michelangelo
 Lungotevere dei Mellini
 Lungotevere Prati
 Lungotevere Castello
 Lungotevere Vaticano
 Lungotevere in Sassia
 Lungotevere Gianicolense
 Lungotevere della Farnesina
 Lungotevere Raffaello Sanzio
 Lungotevere degli Anguillara
 Lungotevere degli Alberteschi
 Lungotevere Ripa
 Lungotevere Portuense
 Lungotevere degli Artigiani
 Lungotevere Vittorio Gassman
 Lungotevere di Pietra Papa
 Lungotevere degli Inventori
 Lungotevere della Magliana
 Lungotevere on the left bank of the Tiber
 Lungotevere dell'Acqua Acetosa
 Lungotevere Salvo D'Acquisto
 Lungotevere Grande Ammiraglio Thaon di Revel
 Lungotevere Flaminio
 Lungotevere delle Navi
 Lungotevere Arnaldo da Brescia
 Lungotevere in Augusta
 Lungotevere Marzio
 Lungotevere Tor di Nona
 Lungotevere degli Altoviti
 Lungotevere dei Fiorentini
 Lungotevere dei Sangallo
 Lungotevere dei Tebaldi
 Lungotevere dei Vallati
 Lungotevere De' Cenci
 Lungotevere dei Pierleoni
 Lungotevere Aventino
 Lungotevere Testaccio
 Lungotevere di San Paolo
 Lungotevere Dante
 Via Cavour
 Via Condotti
 Via Cristoforo Colombo
 Via del Corso
 Via della Conciliazione
 Via dei Coronari
 Via dei Fori Imperiali
 Via Nazionale
 Via Sacra
 Via Veneto

Demographics of Rome 

Demographics of Rome

Government and politics of Rome 

Government of Rome
 Administrative subdivision of Rome
 Metropolitan City of Rome Capital
 Mayor of Rome

Law and order in Rome
 Carabinieri
 Corazzieri

Military in Rome
 Granatieri di Sardegna Mechanized Brigade

History of Rome 
History of Rome
 Timeline of Roman history
 Timeline of the city of Rome

History of Rome, by period or event 

Timeline of the city of Rome
 Rome during the Roman Kingdom (c. 753-509 BC)
 Founding of Rome (circa 752 BC)
 Founding myth: Romulus and Remus
 Overthrow of the Roman monarchy (509 BC) – expulsion of the last king of Rome, Lucius Tarquinius Superbus, and the establishment of the Roman Republic.
 Rome during the Roman Republic (509-27 BC)
 Siege of Rome (508 BC) – Rome is besieged by the city of Clusium
 Sack of Rome (390 BC) – Rome is sacked by the Senones, after the Battle of the Allia
 Rise of Rome (circa 100 BC to the 4th century AD)
 Rome during the Roman Empire (27 BC-285 AD)
 List of Roman emperors
 Great Fire of Rome (64 AD)
 Rome during the Western Roman Empire (285-476AD)
 Sack of Rome (410) – Rome is besieged and sacked by Alaric, King of the Visigoths
 Sack of Rome (455) – Rome is besieged and sacked by Genseric, King of the Vandals
 Deposition of Romulus Augustulus (476) – marked the end of the Western Roman Empire, and the beginning of the European Middle Ages
 Rome during the Kingdom of Odoacer (476–493)
 Rome during the Ostrogothic Kingdom (493–553)
 Siege of Rome (537–538) – Belisarius defends the city against the Ostrogoths
 Siege of Rome (546) – Rome is besieged, sacked and depopulated by Totila, King of the Ostrogoths, Rome during the Gothic War
 Siege of Rome (549–550) – Rome is besieged and captured by Totila, King of the Ostrogoths, Rome during the Gothic War
 Rome during the Eastern Roman Empire (553–754)
 Rome during the Papal States (754–1870)
 Siege of Rome (756) – Rome is besieged by the Lombard prince Aistulf
 Arab raid against Rome (846) – Saracen raiders plundered the outskirts of the city of Rome, sacking the basilicas of Old St Peter's and St Paul's-Outside-the-Walls, but were prevented from entering the city itself by the Aurelian Wall.
 Sack of Rome (1084) – Rome is sacked by the Normans under Robert Guiscard
 Roman Renaissance – mid-15th to the mid-16th centuries
 Banquet of Chestnuts
 Sack of Rome (1527) – Rome is sacked by the mutinous troops of Charles V, Holy Roman Emperor, marking the end of the Roman Renaissance.
 Annexation of Rome by France – the French invaded, under the rule of Napoleon Bonaparte, establishing the Department of Rome. Rome became a canton within the Arrondissement of Rome.
 Siege of Rome (1849) – Rome is besieged by French Second Republic forces Rome during the short-lived Roman Republic
 Rome during the Kingdom of Italy (1870–1946)
 Capture of Rome – Rome was captured by Italian forces in September 1870, ending the Risorgimento, and establishing Rome as the capital of the Kingdom of Italy. It marked both the final defeat of the Papal States under Pope Pius IX and the unification of the Italian peninsula under King Victor Emmanuel II of the House of Savoy.
 Lateran Treaty – treaty signed between Italy and the Catholic Church in 1929. It settled the Roman Question, established the Holy See as a sovereign entity, and recognized Vatican City as an independent state and the sovereign territory of the Holy See, within Rome.
 Holy See – headquartered in its sovereign territory, Vatican City.
 Vatican City (outline) – established in 1929 in the Lateran Treaty as the sovereign territory of the Holy See. It becomes an enclave, within Rome.
 Rome during the Italian Republic (1946–present)

History of Rome, by subject 

 List of popes
 History of sports in Rome
 History of racing in Rome
 Rome Grand Prix

Culture in Rome 

Culture of Rome
 Culture of ancient Rome
 Cuisine of Rome
 Ancient Roman cuisine
 Events in Rome
Festa della Repubblica
 Language of Rome
 People from Rome

Arts in Rome 
Arts in Rome
 Roman art
Ancient Roman pottery
Roman portraiture
Roman sculpture
Roman wall painting (200 BC–AD 79)
 Rome-themed paintings
 Ancient Rome
 Apollo Belvedere
 Augustus of Prima Porta
 Ecstasy of Saint Teresa
 Laocoön and His Sons
 Modern Rome
Pompeian Styles
 Roman Renaissance
 Scuola Romana
 Prix de Rome
 Rome Quadriennale
 Rome Prize

Architecture of Rome 
Architecture of Rome
Ancient Roman architecture
 Ancient monuments
Aqueducts
Arches
Bridges
Catacombs
Defensive walls
Obelisks
Talking statues
Theatres
Tombs
 Fascist architecture in Rome
 EUR, Rome (Esposizione Universale Roma) – Construction of the EUR began in 1936 in anticipation for Mussolini's World Fair in 1942 to mark the 20th anniversary of the Italian fascist era
 Palazzo della Civiltà Italiana – A famous edifice of the EUR
 Tallest buildings in Rome

Cinema of Rome 
Cinema of Rome
 Cinecittà
 Films set in ancient Rome
 Films set in Rome
 Rome Film Festival

Music of Rome 
Music in Rome
 Music of ancient Rome
 Roman School
 Accademia Filarmonica Romana
 Accademia Nazionale di Santa Cecilia
 Parco della Musica
 Teatro dell'Opera di Roma

Theatre of Rome 
Theatre in Rome
Theatre of ancient Rome
 Theatres and opera houses in Rome

Religion in Rome 

Religion in Rome
 Religion in ancient Rome
 Catholicism in Rome
 Pope (Bishop of Rome)
 Primacy of the Bishop of Rome
 Diocese of Rome
 National churches in Rome
 Islam in Rome
 Mosque of Rome
 Roman mythology

Churches in Rome 

Seven Pilgrim Churches of Rome
Titular churches in Rome

Sports in Rome 

Sports in Rome
 Basketball in Rome
 Pallacanestro Virtus Roma
 Football in Rome
 Association football in Rome
 Derby della Capitale
A.S. Roma
S.S. Lazio
 Rugby football in Rome
 Italy national rugby union team
 Unione Rugby Capitolina
 S.S. Lazio Rugby 1927
 Olympics in Rome
 1960 Summer Olympics
1960 Summer Paralympics
 Running in Rome
 Rome Marathon
 Sports venues in Rome
 Stadio Flaminio
 Stadio Olimpico
 Tennis in Rome
Garden Open

Economy and infrastructure of Rome 

Economy of Rome
 Communication in Rome
 Radio stations in Rome
 Fashion industry in Rome
 Hotels in Rome
Aldrovandi Villa Borghese
Boscolo Exedra Roma
Hotel d'Inghilterra
The Westin Excelsior Rome
 Restaurants and cafés in Rome
Antico Caffè Greco
Café de Paris
Cencio la Parolaccia
Giolitti
Harry's Bar
Tourism in Rome
Tourist attractions
Shopping areas and markets

Transportation in Rome 

 
Transport in Rome

Airports in Rome
 Leonardo da Vinci–Fiumicino Airport
 Rome Ciampino Airport
 Rome Urbe Airport

Rail transport in Rome 
 Commuter rail lines
Rome–Giardinetti railway
 Rome–Lido railway
 Railway stations in Rome
 Roma Termini railway station
Roma Tiburtina railway station

Rome Metro 
 Rome Metro
 
 
 
 List of Rome Metro stations
 Trams in Rome
 Trolleybuses in Rome

Road transport in Rome 
 Roads in Rome
Ring road

Education in Rome 

Education in Rome
 Education in ancient Rome
 Italian universities in Rome
 Sapienza University of Rome – founded in 1303
 University of Rome Tor Vergata – founded in 1982
 Roma Tre University – founded in 1992
 Foro Italico University of Rome – founded in 1998
 Link Campus University
 Libera Università Internazionale degli Studi Sociali Guido Carli
 S. Pio V University of Rome
 Libera Università Maria SS. Assunta
 Università Campus Bio-Medico
 Università degli Studi Niccolò Cusano
 Marconi University
 Other colleges in Rome
 American University of Rome
 John Cabot University
 John Felice Rome Center
 Lorenzo de' Medici School
 Pontifical Croatian College of St. Jerome
 Pontifical Gregorian University
 Pontifical North American College
 St. John's University (Italy)
 Roman Colleges
 Almo Collegio Capranica
 Pontifical Ecclesiastical Academy
 Pontifical Roman Major Seminary

Healthcare in Rome 

 Medicine in ancient Rome

Hospitals in Rome

 Fatebenefratelli Hospital
 Policlinico Umberto I
 San Giovanni Addolorata Hospital
 Sant'Eugenio Hospital

See also 

 Outline of ancient Rome
 Outline of geography

References

External links 

 Comune of Rome 
  APT (official Tourist Office) of the City of Rome 
 Rome Museums – Official site 
 Capitoline Museums 

Rome
Rome
 1